Penthouse TV is a Canadian English language specialty channel that broadcasts adult entertainment material, primarily in the form of pornographic films. The channel's name is licensed from the American men's magazine Penthouse. Penthouse TV is owned by Fifth Dimension Properties Inc, a company wholly owned by Stuart Duncan, majority owner of Ten Broadcasting.

History
In May 2007, Fifth Dimension Properties Inc. was granted approval by the Canadian Radio-television and Telecommunications Commission (CRTC) to launch 'PENTHOUSE TV', described as "a national, English-language Category 2 specialty programming service devoted exclusively to feature driven couples-oriented adult entertainment, including both amateur and professional actors simulating amateur performances."

Penthouse TV was launched in July 2008 on Shaw Cable in a select number of markets. It was launched later by other television service providers such as Shaw Direct on September 30, 2009 and on Rogers Cable on October 15, 2009.

Programming
The Canadian version of Penthouse TV plays adult-oriented movies back-to-back, 24 hours a day.  Each month about 100 individual movies are aired on average of four times each.  A movie from Penthouse Digital Studios is premiered every Friday night.

See also
Penthouse TV (US)

References

External links
 

Canadian pornographic television channels
Television channels and stations established in 2008
Digital cable television networks in Canada
English-language television stations in Canada
Commercial-free television networks
Penthouse (magazine)